The Kyneton Guardian was a newspaper based in Kyneton, Victoria, Australia. Founded in September 1856 by Mitchell King Armstrong on High Street in Kyneton, it later absorbed the Kyneton Observer.

In 1979, the paper was relaunched as the Guardian Express, this later became the Midland Express which is still based in Kyneton today.

References

External links
 Kyneton Historical Society which holds past and current issues
 Kyneton Guardian (Vic. : 1870 - 1880; 1914 - 1918) digitised copy on Trove

1856 establishments in Australia
Kyneton, Victoria